Tuupovaara (Kovero until 1913) is a former municipality of Finland, located in the province of North Karelia. It was consolidated, together with Kiihtelysvaara, into the municipality of Joensuu on January 1, 2005. The municipality had a population of 2,217 (2004) and covered an area of 661.34 km² of which 56.55 km² is water. The population density was 3.7 inhabitants per km².

The municipality was unilingually Finnish.

The famous rally driver Ari Vatanen was born in Tuupovaara on April 27, 1952.

Former municipalities of Finland
Joensuu
Populated places disestablished in 2005